HMS B9 was one of 11 B-class submarines built for the Royal Navy in the first decade of the 20th century. Completed in 1906, she was initially assigned to the Home Fleet, before the boat was transferred to the Mediterranean six years later. After the First World War began in 1914, B9 played a minor role in the Dardanelles Campaign. The boat was transferred to the Adriatic Sea in 1916 to support Italian forces against the Austro-Hungarian Navy. She was converted into a patrol boat in 1917 and was sold for scrap in 1919.

Design and description
The B class was an enlarged and improved version of the preceding A class. They displaced  on the surface and  submerged. The B-class submarines had a crew of two officers and thirteen ratings.

For surface running, the boats were powered by a single 16-cylinder  Vickers petrol engine that drove one propeller shaft. When submerged the propeller was driven by a  electric motor. They could reach  on the surface and  underwater.

The boats were armed with two 18-inch (450 mm) torpedo tubes in the bow. They could carry a pair of reload torpedoes, but generally did not as they would have to remove an equal weight of fuel in compensation.

Construction and career
Ordered as part of the 1904–1905 Naval Programme, B9 was built by Vickers at their Barrow-in-Furness shipyard. She was launched on 26 January 1906 and completed on 28 April at a cost of £47,000. The B-class submarines were initially assigned to the Third Division of the Home Fleet, based at Portsmouth and Devonport, and were tasked with coastal-defence duties and defending the Straits of Dover in wartime.

After the start of the First World War and the unsuccessful pursuit of the German ships Goeben and Breslau in August 1914, the B-class submarines were transferred to the Dardanelles area in mid-September to prevent any breakout attempt by the German ships. After the arrival of the larger and more modern E-class submarines in early 1915, the B-class boats began to return to Malta. After the Kingdom of Italy joined the Allies in May 1915, the B-class submarines in the Mediterranean were transferred to Venice to reinforce Italian forces in the northern Adriatic. She saw no targets and returned to Venice three days later. The five British submarines made a total of 13 patrols off the Austro-Hungarian coast before the end of 1915, hampered by bad weather and drifting mines, followed by 13 more in the first two months of 1916.

While on a patrol off the entrance to Pola on 29 March, B9 was spotted and unsuccessfully attacked by a pair of Lohner L flying boats. The following month, the boat began a refit at Venice that lasted for several months. On 18–20 October, B9 made the last patrol, an uneventful one, by a B-class submarine in the Adriatic off the coast of Istria. Replaced by more modern H-class submarines, the B-class boats returned to Malta on 9 November to be converted into surface patrol boats, armed with a 12-pounder gun. Redesignated as S9 in August 1917, the boat was assigned to patrol the Otranto Barrage that was intended to prevent the Austro-Hungarian Navy from breaking out of the Adriatic, although she proved to be very unreliable in service. Paid off at Malta, she was sold for scrap in 1919.

Notes

References
 
 
 
 
 

 

British B-class submarines
World War I submarines of the United Kingdom
Ships built in Barrow-in-Furness
Royal Navy ship names
1906 ships